The Tale of Ruby Rose is a 1988 Australian film written and directed by Roger Scholes, produced by Andrew Wiseman and Bryce Menzies, and starring Melita Jurisic, Chris Haywood, Rod Zuanic, Sheila Florance, and Martyn Sanderson.

Synopsis
In the wild and isolated wilderness of the Tasmanian highlands, Ruby Rose is overcome by her fear of darkness. Ruby cries out to the elemental spirits that surround her. She is driven to take a harrowing journey out of the mountains to seek help from her lost grandmother.

Production
As the title indicates, the film centres on Ruby and her complex emotions. The character is based on a story told to Roger Scholes by an old woman, Mrs Miles of Mole Creek Valley. As a young woman, she had lived alone in a hut in the Highlands for four years, without knowing that her husband had died while trying to get back to her in the middle of winter. The experience traumatised her.

Scholes was also interested in the naïve art created by a people with mental disturbance or trauma, and its similarities with prehistoric art (he studied case histories as a student in Melbourne). That is why Ruby fills notebooks with her own drawing. She is much younger than Henry, and she was traumatised as a child. She has created her own cosmology, based on fear and observation of the natural world. She feels safe only in the day. When Henry and Gem go off trapping for days on end, she is alone with her fears in the hut. She identifies the colour white with the sun, warmth and light; that is why she uses flour to make her face white. By this stage in the movie the audience is fully aware of Ruby's mental instability and her terror of the dark. That is why her journey is so remarkable: to be out after dark requires a supreme act of will.

Roger Scholes was interested in the way that isolation had shaped women's lives in this region. In the late 1970s, when he was researching, he met and photographed many people who had lived all their lives in the harsh environment of the Tasmanian Highlands. He was preparing a book, based on the interviews and photographs, but it was never completed. He decided to turn the material into a feature film instead. The Tale of Ruby Rose was his first and is still his only feature film, although he has developed a number of other projects. Scholes has concentrated largely on documentary since this film.

Release
The film was screened widely at festivals throughout the world.

See also
 Cinema of Australia

References

External links

The Tale of Ruby Rose at Australian Screen Online
The Tale of Ruby Rose at Oz Movies

1987 films
Australian drama films
Films set in Tasmania
1980s English-language films